Defending champion Pete Sampras defeated Andre Agassi in the final, 5–7, 6–3, 6–3 to win the men's singles tennis title at the 1994 Miami Open. With the win, he completed the Sunshine Double. The start of the final had been delayed for 50 minutes while Sampras received treatment for a stomach virus, and Agassi had the right to claim a walkover victory. Agassi instead chose to give Sampras the necessary time to receive the treatment that he needed so that he could play in the final.

Seeds
All thirty-two seeds received a bye into the second round.

Draw

Finals

Top half

Section 1

Section 2

Section 3

Section 4

Bottom half

Section 5

Section 6

Section 7

Section 8

See also 
 Agassi–Sampras rivalry

External links
 Main draw

Men's Singles